York East was a provincial electoral district in Ontario, Canada. It was formed in 1867, the same year as the beginning of the country and it elected members up until 1999 when it was dissolved. Initially it covered a large swath of territory stretching from Lake Ontario north to Richmond Hill. It was formed based on the eastern part of the county of York. Over time as the population increased, the territory was reduced. By the late 1950s it represented only a portion of the borough of East York, a small municipality on the edge of Toronto. In 1999 it was abolished and its remaining territory was distributed between Beaches—East York and Don Valley West ridings.

Boundaries
In 1867, the County of York was subdivided into four ridings, York East, York North, York South, and York West. York East consisted of the townships of Markham, Scarborough, and any areas east of Yonge Street excluding the city of Toronto. It also included the village of Yorkville. These boundaries coincided with the Federal riding of the same name.

In 1874, the village of Richmond Hill was removed.

In 1885, Richmond Hill was added back.

In 1926 portions of the riding were lost to the new ridings of Eglinton and Beaches. This reflected changes to the boundaries of the city of Toronto.

In 1955, following the incorporation of Metropolitan Toronto,  Scarborough Township  was separated and York Scarborough  became a separate riding. Eight years later, that riding was divided into four further separate ridings.

By 1963, the boundaries had been reduced to encompass a portion of territory within the bounds of Metro Toronto. This consisted of the area South of Steeles Avenue East, west of Victoria Park Avenue and east of Yonge Street, excluding the area within the old city of Toronto.

In 1967, the riding was subdivided into three parts. The northern portion became the new riding of York Mills, the middle portion became the riding of Don Mills and the southern portion retained the name York East.

Except for minor boundary changes, the riding stayed much the same until it was dissolved in 1999.

Members of Provincial Parliament

Election history

1977
Robert Elgie (PC) 14131
Lois Cox (NDP) 8334
Mike Kenny (L) 7126
Chris Greenland (Ind [SC?]) 265
Maura O'Neill (Comm) 245
Paul Wakfer (Lbt) 144

1981
Robert Elgie (PC) 14562
Lois Cox (NDP) 4935
Don McNeill (L) 4811
Ed McDonald (Comm) 628
E. Scott Hughes (Unparty) 460

1985
Robert Elgie (PC) 11459
Gord Crann (NDP) 9183
Omar Chaudhery (L) 6629
Ed McDonald (Comm) 929
Kathy Sorensen (Lbt) 410

1987
Christine Hart (L) 15683
Peter Oyler (PC) 7352
Sophia Apostolides (NDP) 7056
Chris Frazer (Comm) 527

1990
Gary Malkowski (NDP) 10,689 (35.8%)
Christine Hart (L) 9900 (33.2%) 		
George Bryson (PC) 8021 (26.9%) 				
Jim Copeland 380 (1.3%)
 Bedora Bojman (G) 364 (1.2%)
John Matthew (Lbt) 303 (1.0%)
Chris Frazer (Comm) 191 (0.6%)

1995
John Parker (PC) 12789
Gary Malkowski (NDP) 9526
Steve Mastoras (L) 7398
Steve Kotsopoulos (Ind) 497
John Richardson (Ind) 251
Marilyn Pepper (NLP) 243

References

Notes

Citations

Former provincial electoral districts of Ontario
Provincial electoral districts of Toronto